The Palawan tit (Pardaliparus amabilis) is a species of bird in the tit family Paridae.

It is endemic to Palawan and the smaller islands of Calauit and Balabac in the Philippines. Within its range it is found in lowland forest habitats, including secondary forests, forest edge, swamps as well as submontane forest. It feeds on small insects, insect larvae, seeds, and fruit. It generally occurs singly or in pairs, and will join mixed-species feeding flocks.

The male Palawan tit has a black head, throat and neck, a yellow back, belly and breast, and pied black and white wings and tail. The female exhibits limited sexual dimorphism, having an olive back, but is otherwise similar to the male. 
  
It is threatened by habitat loss, particularly the recent beginning of logging on the island. It is listed as near threatened by the IUCN.

References

Sources
 BirdLife International 2004.  Parus amabilis.   2006 IUCN Red List of Threatened Species.   Downloaded on 26 July 2007.
 Gosler, A. & P. Clement (2007) "Family Paridae (Tits and Chickadees)" P.p. 662-709.  in del Hoyo, J.; Elliot, A. & Christie D. (editors). (2007). Handbook of the Birds of the World. Volume 12: Picathartes to Tits and Chickadees. Lynx Edicions. 

Palawan tit
Birds of Palawan
Palawan tit
Taxonomy articles created by Polbot